The J-Crown (also known as J-Crown Octuple Unified Championship) was formed originally by New Japan Pro-Wrestling as a way of unifying eight junior heavyweight and cruiserweight titles from several different organizations. The J-Crown tournament was held in August 1996.

History
The J-Crown was the unification of eight different championship belts from five different organizations, including ones from both Japan and Mexico. The tournament to crown the first champions was held over four nights, from August 2 to August 5, 1996, the same dates that New Japan Pro-Wrestling's annual G1 Climax event took place, promoting two major tournaments on one tour. Jushin Thunder Liger is credited with coming up with the idea for the J-Crown. The inaugural champion was The Great Sasuke.

The J-Crown was defended for just over a year. While Ultimo Dragon was champion, the titles appeared on World Championship Wrestling programming, as Dragon also held the WCW Cruiserweight Championship and the NWA World Middleweight Championship at the time. When Liger was champion, he lost the WAR International Junior Heavyweight Championship to Yuji Yasuraoka on June 6, 1997, in Tokyo, Japan. Liger, however, continued to defend the J-Crown with seven titles instead of eight.

As part of their introduction of a new WWF Light Heavyweight Championship, the World Wrestling Federation demanded that the then current champion Shinjiro Otani return the belt. Otani dissolved the J-Crown on November 5, 1997, by vacating all of  the component titles except for the IWGP Junior Heavyweight Championship, with the other belts being restored to their home promotions.

Championships

Tournament

Title history

References

External links
J-CROWN Octuple Title Unification

Professional wrestling accomplishments